Jeff Pope (born September 27, 1976) is an American actor known for his roles in The Highwaymen, Interview with the Vampire, The Underground Railroad, Hap and Leonard, and others.

Filmography

Film

Television

References 

1976 births
Male actors from Memphis, Tennessee
Male actors from Tennessee
American male film actors
American male television actors
20th-century American male actors
Living people